Fernando Zappia (born 22 February 1955, in Buenos Aires) is a former Argentine football defender.

Zappia started his career with River Plate after a short spell with Lanús he joined Austrian side Wacker Innsbruck in 1978.

From 1980 until 1990 Zappia played in France for a number of teams, he had two spells with AS Nancy and also played for Metz and Lille OSC.

Late in his career he returned to Argentina to play for Atlanta in the lower leagues.

Honours

References

 Fernando Zappia at BDFA.com.ar 
  
 

1955 births
Living people
Footballers from Buenos Aires
Argentine footballers
Argentine expatriate footballers
Association football defenders
Club Atlético River Plate footballers
Club Atlético Lanús footballers
FC Wacker Innsbruck players
AS Nancy Lorraine players
FC Metz players
Lille OSC players
Expatriate footballers in France
Expatriate footballers in Austria
Ligue 1 players
Ligue 2 players
Club Atlético Atlanta footballers
Argentine expatriate sportspeople in Austria
Argentine expatriate sportspeople in France